Mongoliulidae is a family of millipedes belonging to the order Julida.

Genera

Genera:
 Ansiulus Takakuwa, 1940 
 Ikahoiulus Takakuwa, 1941 
 Koiulus

References

Julida